Theodora Giareni (born 3 March 1990 in Marousi, Athens, Greece) is a Greek swimmer. At the 2012 Summer Olympics, she competed for the national team in the Women's 4 x 100 metre freestyle relay.  The team finished in 16th (last) place in the heats, failing to reach the final.

2016 Olympics
She failed a doping control test was sent home from the 2016 Rio Olympic Games. In 2017 she received a 4 year ban from swimming competition.

References

Greek female swimmers
Living people
Olympic swimmers of Greece
Swimmers at the 2012 Summer Olympics
Greek female freestyle swimmers
Mediterranean Games silver medalists for Greece
Swimmers at the 2013 Mediterranean Games
Mediterranean Games medalists in swimming
1990 births
Swimmers from Athens
20th-century Greek women
21st-century Greek women